Aixàs is a village in south-west Andorra. It belongs to the parish of Sant Julià de Lòria. To its west are Civís and Os de Civís in Spain, to its north Xixerella, to its east Santa Coloma, and to its south Aixovall. 

Populated places in Andorra
Sant Julià de Lòria